West Des Moines Community School District, or West Des Moines Community Schools (WDMCS), is a school district headquartered in West Des Moines, Iowa.

The district is mostly in Polk County, with a section in Dallas County. In addition to West Des Moines, the  district serves sections of Clive, Urbandale, and Windsor Heights.

Schools
High Schools:
 Valley High School (grades 10–12)
 Valley Southwoods Freshman High School (grade 9)
Alternative High School:
 Walnut Creek Campus

Junior High Schools:
 Indian Hills Junior High School
 Stilwell Junior High School 

Elementary schools:
 Clive Learning Academy
 Crestview School of Inquiry
 Crossroads Park Elementary
 Fairmeadows Elementary
 Hillside Elementary
 Jordan Creek Elementary
 Western Hills Elementary
 Westridge Elementary

References

External links
 West Des Moines Community School District
 
School districts in Iowa
West Des Moines, Iowa
Urbandale, Iowa
Education in Dallas County, Iowa
Education in Polk County, Iowa